Portions From a Wine-Stained Notebook is written by Charles Bukowski, edited by David Stephen Calonne, and published by City Lights.

Table of Contents

Aftermath of a Lengthy Rejection Slip
20 Tanks From Kasseldown
Hard Without Music
Trace: Editors Write
Portions From a Wine-Stained Notebook
A Rambling Essay on Poetics and the Bleeding Life Written While Drinking a Six-Pack (Tall)
In Defense of a Certain Type of Poetry, a Certain Type of Life, a Certain Type of Blood-Filled Creature Who will Someday Die
Artaud Anthology
An Old Drunk Who Ran Out of Luck
Notes of a Dirty Old Man
Untitled Essay in A Tribute to Jim Lowell
Notes of a Dirty Old Man
The Night Nobody Believed I was Allen Ginsberg
Should We Burn Uncle Sam's Ass?
The Silver Christ of Santa Fe
Dirty Old Man Confesses
Reading and Breeding for Kenneth
The L.A. Scene
Notes on the Life of an Aged Poet
Upon the Mathematics of the Breath and the Way
Notes of a Dirty Old Man
Notes of a Dirty Old Man
Notes of a Dirty Old Man
Unpublished Foreword to William Wantling's 7 on Style
Jaggernaut
Picking the Horses
Workout
The Way it Happened
Just Passing Time
Distractions in the Literary Life
I Meet the Master
Charles Bukowski's Los Angeles for Li Po
Looking Back at a Big One
Another Portfolio
The Other
Basic Training

References

External links
Book description
Portions From A Wine-Stained Notebook Quotes

2008 short story collections
City Lights Publishers books
Books by Charles Bukowski